Jerod is a given name. Notable people with the given name include:

Je'Rod Cherry (born 1973), American football player
Jerod Haase (born 1974), American basketball coach
Jerod Mayo (born 1986), American football player
Jerod Mixon (born 1981), American actor
Jerod Morris, American sportswriter
Jerod Swallow (born 1966), American ice dancer
Jerod Turner (born 1975), American golfer
Jerod Ward (born 1976), American baseball player
Jerod Zaleski (born 1989), Canadian football player

See also
Reginald Jerod Jackson (born 1973), American basketball player
Tony Jerod-Eddie (born 1990), American football player